Heteropsis phaea is a butterfly in the family Nymphalidae. It is found in Angola, the Democratic Republic of the Congo, Uganda, Kenya, Tanzania and Zambia. The habitat consists of open Brachystegia woodland.

Subspecies
Heteropsis phaea phaea (Angola, eastern and southern Democratic Republic of the Congo, Uganda, north-western Tanzania, western Kenya, Zambia)
Heteropsis phaea ignota (Libert, 2006) (Democratic Republic of the Congo)

References

Elymniini
Butterflies described in 1894
Butterflies of Africa